Jamie Terence McGrath (born 30 September 1996) is an Irish professional footballer who plays for Dundee United in the Scottish Premiership, on loan from EFL League One club Wigan Athletic, and the Republic of Ireland national team.  He has previously played for St Mirren, Dundalk and St Patrick's Athletic.

Career

Early career
A native of Athboy, County Meath, McGrath played youth football for his local club Athboy Celtic before joining top Dublin youth side Cherry Orchard. He played for UCD under 19's before joining St Patrick's Athletic under 19 side on their scholarship scheme with NUI Maynooth. He played for Pats under 19's for two seasons, including a league winning campaign in which McGrath scored two goals against Derry City under 19's in the final. He progressed into the first team in 2014 whilst still playing for the club's under 19 side.

St Patrick's Athletic

2014 season
McGrath made his senior debut with the first team on 9 September 2014 as he played the full 90 minutes in a 2–1 win over Longford Town in the 2014 Leinster Senior Cup Final at City Calling Stadium. McGrath impressed Saints fans with his display, including an excellent through ball to set up Jack Bayly's winning goal in the 64th minute. His League of Ireland debut came on 17 October 2014 when he started against Athlone Town in a 2–0 loss at Richmond Park.

2015 season
He was named as a first team player ahead of the 2015 season, with number 19 being assigned to McGrath as his squad number. Mid season when first choice striker Christy Fagan picked up a knee injury, McGrath had an extended run in the starting 11 as a striker and scored his first goals away to Drogheda United and Sligo Rovers in consecutive away games to secure 2–0 and 3–0 wins respectively. McGrath made his first appearances in UEFA competition when he came on from the bench both away and at home against Latvian side Skonto Riga in the Europa League. McGrath came on at the start of extra time in the 2015 League of Ireland Cup Final as Pats drew 0–0 with Galway United before winning 4–3 on penalties to win the League Cup at Eamonn Deacy Park. McGrath received rave reviews from fans, pundits and the media alike for his breakthrough season, coming in a second behind Lee Desmond in the club's Young Player of the Year awards.

2016 season
Although he struggled with shin splints that kept him out of games at the beginning of the 2016 season, his importance to the team increased in a season where the team struggled to deal with the midfield losses of Chris Forrester, Greg Bolger, Killian Brennan and James Chambers. Those losses however, created an opportunity for McGrath to play a lot of games in the role of attacking midfielder throughout the season. His first goal of the season was an 89th-minute strike to rescue a point at home to relegation fighting Longford Town live on Eir Sport. His only appearance in Europe for the season came against Dinamo Minsk of Belarus as Pats lost 1–0 at home and were knocked out of the Europa League in the second qualifying round. McGrath played a huge part in the Saints retaining their League Cup trophy as he played in every game, scoring away from home against Bray Wanderers in the quarter finals, Shamrock Rovers in the semi's and Limerick in the Final. Following a good season for McGrath, he was voted St Patrick's Athletic Young Player of the Season by the club's supporters.

Dundalk
McGrath moved from St Patrick's Athletic to Dundalk for an undisclosed transfer fee on 15 January 2017.

St Mirren
After winning back-to-back League of Ireland Premier Division titles with Dundalk, McGrath signed a -year deal with Scottish Premiership side St Mirren on 7 January 2020.

Wigan Athletic
On 31 January 2022, transfer deadline day, McGrath signed for EFL League One club Wigan Athletic on a 2-and-a-half-year contract.

Dundee United loan
On 3 August 2022, he joined Dundee United on loan until the end of the 2022–23 season. He made his debut the following day, providing the assist for Glenn Middleton's goal in a 1–0 win over AZ Alkmaar in the UEFA Europa Conference League.

International career
McGrath's first taste of under-19's international football came when he was called up to the Republic of Ireland under-19s by Paul Doolin for their November 2014 games against Malta and Gibraltar. His first appearance came against Malta in a 1–0 win in Waterford. He went on to make a total of six appearances for the 19's, scoring twice vs Azerbaijan at Tallaght Stadium. McGrath was called up to the Republic of Ireland under-21 squad for the first time by manager Noel King on 8 November 2016, for their games against Czech Republic and Slovakia in La Manga Club, Spain.

On 24 May 2021, McGrath received his first call up to the Republic of Ireland senior squad by his former Dundalk manager Stephen Kenny for the summer friendlies against Andorra and Hungary, making his full international debut in the away fixture in Andorra on 3 June 2021. His first senior start for Ireland came in a 2–1 loss in a 2022 World Cup qualifier against Portugal on 1 September 2021 at the Estádio Algarve in Faro, in which he provided the assist for John Egan's opening goal.

Career statistics

Club

International

Honours
St Patrick's Athletic
 FAI Cup (1): 2014
 League of Ireland Cup (2): 2015, 2016
 Leinster Senior Cup (1): 2014

Dundalk
 League of Ireland Premier Division (2): 2018, 2019
 FAI Cup: 2018
 League of Ireland Cup (2): 2017, 2019
 President of Ireland's Cup (1): 2019
 Champions Cup (1): 2019

Wigan Athletic
 EFL League One: 2021–22

Individual
 St Patrick's Athletic Young Player of the Season: 2016
 PFAI Young Player of the Year: 2018
 St Mirren Player of the Year: 2020–21

References

External links

1996 births
Living people
Association footballers from County Meath
Republic of Ireland association footballers
Association football midfielders
Republic of Ireland youth international footballers
Republic of Ireland under-21 international footballers
Republic of Ireland international footballers
Cherry Orchard F.C. players
University College Dublin A.F.C. players
St Patrick's Athletic F.C. players
Dundalk F.C. players
St Mirren F.C. players
Wigan Athletic F.C. players
Dundee United F.C. players
League of Ireland players
Scottish Professional Football League players
English Football League players